Bamforth National Wildlife Refuge is located in southern Albany County in the U.S. state of Wyoming and includes 1,116 acres (4.5 km2). The refuge is managed by the U.S. Fish and Wildlife Service an agency within the U.S. Department of the Interior. The refuge is divided into three sections adjacent to Bamforth Reservoir, which is primarily owned by the state of Wyoming. The refuge is closed to the public and is unstaffed. Bamforth NWR is administered by Arapaho National Wildlife Refuge in Colorado.

References

External links
 

Protected areas of Albany County, Wyoming
National Wildlife Refuges in Wyoming
Protected areas established in 1932
1932 establishments in Wyoming